Khardan (also Romanized as Khārdān; also known as Aḩshām-e Ommīd ‘Alī, Akbarābād-e Kāhdān, Kāhedān, and Kāhedān-e Pā’īn) is a village in Khabar Rural District, in the Central District of Baft County, Kerman Province, Iran. At the 2006 census, its population was 125, in 25 families.

References 

Populated places in Baft County